The 1926–27 Swiss National Ice Hockey Championship was the 17th edition of the national ice hockey championship in Switzerland. HC Davos won the championship by defeating HC Rosey Gstaad in the final.

First round

Eastern Series 
 EHC St. Moritz - HC Davos 1:2

HC Davos qualified for the final.

Western Series

Semifinals 
 HC Château-d’Œx - HC Caux 13:1
 HC Rosey Gstaad - Star Lausanne 15:0

Final 
HC Rosey Gstaad - HC Château-d’Œx 5:1

HC Rosey Gstaad qualified for the final.

Final 
 HC Rosey Gstaad - HC Davos 1:7

External links 
Swiss Ice Hockey Federation – All-time results

National
Swiss National Ice Hockey Championship seasons